is a Japanese manga series written and illustrated by Kōji Kiriyama. It was serialized in Shueisha's shōnen manga magazine Weekly Shōnen Jump from June 1993 to September 1995, with is chapters collected in nine tankōbon volumes. A 55-episode anime television series, produced by Fuji TV, Yomiko Advertising and Studio Pierrot, aired on Fuji TV between January 1995 and February 1996. A sequel manga, titled Ninku 2nd Stage: Story of Etonins, was serialized in Shueisha's seinen manga magazine Ultra Jump from September 2005 to September 2011, with its chapters collected in 12 tankōbon volumes. As of September 2011, Ninku had over 9 million copies in circulation.

Plot

Manga
The story follows an odd-looking 12-year-old boy named Fūsuke, a powerful warrior from the Ninku school of martial arts, who command a style that mixes ninjutsu and kung fu. Before the present time in the story, the Ninku were targeted by an evil empire and the Ninku corps were formed to combat the menace. The names of the corps were taken from the twelve Chinese zodiac animals and each captain of the corps was called the zodiac animal Ninku master. Their powers are derived from nature and a specific dragon to their own element, with the  being the almighty master of all the elements. The Ninku were disbanded by their master before the end of the war and as such, the Empire was victorious and the Ninku became vilified by the Empire as the perpetrators of the war and made attempts to eliminate any surviving members. Three years later, Fūsuke, the young former captain of the 1st Ninku corps and controller of the wind and Hiroyuki, his flatulent penguin, start a journey, searching for the other Ninku captains. However, a new group of Ninku users has arisen and are trying to take over the world. Fūsuke and his penguin must defeat the new Ninku empire with the help of his old comrades.

Anime
Fūsuke, the former captain of the first division Ninku corps journeys across the land with his pet hiroyuki and the hot headed Rihoko to find his Mother who was taken from him at a very young age by the Imperial Army leader Kochin. On his travels, he reunites with fellow captains Toji and Aicho who begin to travel with him in hopes to not only stop the rise of the Imperial Army, but to restore respect to the Ninku students. Along the journey, Fūsuke and the others are tasked with finding and controlling the mystical sky dragons in order to become stronger.

Characters

Main characters

 is the former captain of the 1st Ninku corps, the rat Ninku. With the ability to control wind, Fūsuke searches for other former Ninku after a war with an evil empire.

 is the former captain of the 10th Ninku corps, the rooster Ninku, and has extremely strong legs with an attitude to match, enabling him to cover large distances in a single bound and cause big damage on enemy machinery through his techniques. He also hates women, as this can be seen in his attitude towards Tōji's sister, who has a crush on him. He also considers Tōji an idiot.

 is the former captain of the 6th Ninku corps, the snake Ninku, specializing in land (ground) attacks and techniques. He owns his own personal plane which he initially dubbed the Hindenburg but he sometimes changes the name to other transport disasters. The Hindenburg usually crash-lands in the beginning of the show as a recurring gag. His technique is the FuShabakut or "Air Dessert", which turns the ground into a tsunami-like state, a high-level Ninku move.

Hiroyuki is Fūsuke's pet penguin. He possesses the ability to release explosive farts powerful enough to propel Fūsuke and itself. The stench is described as terrible and can knock others unconscious. Fūsuke considers him a friend and not a pet. He is supernaturally powerful.

Tōji's sister. She was unintentionally rescued by Fūsuke from fake Ninku and, at the time, he was unaware that she is Tōji's sister. She desperately wants to meet handsome men and immediately becomes infatuated with Aichō, but has little luck with him.

Enemies

The high priest of the Empire and a master of feng shui. He is the spokesperson of the Emperor and it was he who defeated the Ninku master in a direct duel, forcing the Ninku to disband. His ultimate goal is to control the power of the Sky Dragon and for that purpose he has captured Fūsuke's mother in order to draw the dragon out.

A Former Ninku captain who could command ice. After his fiancé was killed during the war he headed out to attack the Empire singlehandedly but was captured and convinced to join the Empire to prevent another war. Later reforms and helps Fūsuke and the others in their final confrontation.

A genjutsu expert. She was taken by Kōchin at a very young age and her family was slaughtered by him. Only later does she learn this and turn against him.

The sole heir of a martial arts that uses electricity channeled from arm guards into his fists and feet. Later defects after being beaten by Fūsuke.

Media

Manga
Ninku, written and illustrated by Kōji Kiriyama, started in Shueisha's shōnen manga magazine Weekly Shōnen Jump on June 14, 1993. The series was suspended on July 11, 1994, with 53 chapters published. The manga resumed publication as Ninku 2nd Stage on December 5, 1994, and finished after 27 chapters on September 4, 1995. Shueisha collected the chapters in nine tankōbon volume, published from January 11, 1994, to November 2, 1995. Shueisha republished the manga in six bunkoban volumes from November 17, 2006, to February 16, 2007.

Ninku was published in France by Glénat between 1997 and 1998.

A sequel, titled , was serialized in Shueisha's seinen manga magazine Ultra Jump from September 17, 2005, to September 17, 2011. Shueisha collected its chapters into twelve tankōbon volumes, published between March 3, 2006, and November 4, 2011.

Volume list

Ninku

|}

Ninku 2nd Stage: Story of Etonins

Films
Prior to the anime television series, a film titled  was screened at Jump Super Anime Tour in November 1994. A 26-minute film titled  was screened at the Toei Anime Fair on July 15, 1995.

Media Blasters's Anime Works brand released Ninku: The Movie with an English dub on VHS in 1998. It was later released on DVD, along with Yu Yu Hakusho: The Movie, on January 30, 2001, as a result of a poll conducted by Media Blasters.

Anime
Ninku was adapted into a 55-episode anime television series, produced by Fuji TV, Yomiko Advertising and Studio Pierrot, and directed by Noriyuki Abe. It was broadcast on Fuji TV from January 14, 1995, to February 24, 1996. Reruns of the series have been broadcast on Kids Station. The anime series includes an original story and characters not presented in the manga series. Geneon Entertainment has released the series in two DVD boxsets in Japan. The first set containing the initial 28 episodes was released on February 25, 2005 and the second set containing the remaining 27 episodes was released on March 21, 2005. In 2015, Bandai Visual re-released the series on two Blu-ray box sets, the first one on May 21 and the second on July 15.

Ninku was also broadcast in other parts of Asia on Animax Asia.

Episode list

Video games
A number of video games based on the series have been released. Two video games were launched for the Game Boy, three video games for the Game Gear, a video game for the PlayStation, and a video game for the Sega Saturn. Fūsuke is also featured as a selectable character in the Weekly Shōnen Jump crossover fighting game Jump Ultimate Stars, launched for the Nintendo DS in November 2006. Characters from the series also appeared in another Weekly Shōnen Jump crossover smartphone game Jumputi Heroes, released for iOS and Android in 2018.

Reception and legacy
As of September 2011, the manga had over 9 million copies in circulation.

In a fan poll posted by BIGLOBE in 2012 about favorite Weekly Shōnen Jump anime adaptations, Ninku ranked 45th out of 50 anime adaptations, and 40th out of 60 series in a 2019 poll conducted by Goo Ranking of "’90s Anime That Deserve Remakes".

John Oppliger of AnimeNation attributed the low popularity of the Ninku anime series to its lack of compelling narrative development and the sequential lengthy story arc structure that make other shōnen action series like Naruto, One Piece and Bleach popular. He praised the characters and animation of the fight sequences, but considered them repetitive and he stated that the show does not encourage much viewer loyalty.

In a review for the Ninku/YuYu Hakusho Double Feature DVD release, Chris Beveridge from Mania.com praised Ninku: The Movie for its fight sequences and animation, but recommended this release only to fans of either series. Mike Toole of Anime Jump in his Ninku: The Movie review stated: "Aside from the engaging story and great fight scenes, there are a few other good points about Ninku."
 
Ninku has inspired artists such as Masashi Kishimoto of Naruto fame, who used to copy Kiriyama's drawings in his studying to become a manga artist.

References

External links
Anime official profile at Studio Pierrot 
Ninku: The Movie at Rotten Tomatoes

1993 manga
1995 anime television series debuts
1995 anime films
1996 anime films
2005 manga
Adventure anime and manga
Anime Works
Animated films based on manga
Fantasy anime and manga
Films directed by Noriyuki Abe
Fuji TV original programming
Martial arts anime and manga
Pierrot (company)
Seinen manga
Shōnen manga
Shueisha franchises
Shueisha manga
Tomy games